The 1957 United States Senate special election in Texas was held on April 2, 1957 to complete the unexpired term of Senator Price Daniel, who resigned to become Governor of Texas. Interim Senator William Blakley did not run for re-election. The race was won by Ralph Yarborough with a plurality of the vote; no majority was required. Yarborough became the second person since World War II to win election to the Senate with under 40% of the vote.

Background
In November 1956, incumbent Senator Price Daniel was elected Governor of Texas. He resigned from the Senate before taking office in January 1957. Outgoing Governor Allan Shivers appointed William Blakley to fill the seat until a successor could be duly elected, with the election scheduled for April 2. The winner would finish Daniel's term ending in 1959.

Candidates

Major candidates
Searcy Bracewell (Democratic), State Senator from Houston and President pro tempore of the Texas Senate
Martin Dies Jr. (Democratic), U.S. Representative from Lufkin (representing Texas at-large)
James P. Hart (Democratic), former Justice of the Texas Supreme Court
Thad Hutcheson (Republican), Houston attorney
John Coyle White (Democratic), Texas Agriculture Commissioner since 1951
Ralph Yarborough (Democratic), Travis County District Judge and candidate for Governor in 1952, 1954, and 1956

Minor candidates
None of these candidates received more than 0.25% of the popular vote.

Results

See also 
 1957 United States Senate elections

References 

1957
Texas
United States Senate
Texas 1957
Texas 1957
United States Senate 1957